Paul Brian Saxton (born March 13, 1972) is a former American football tight end who played for the New York Giants and Atlanta Falcons of the National Football League (NFL). He played college football at Boston College.

References 

1972 births
Living people
People from Hanover Township, New Jersey
Players of American football from New Jersey
Sportspeople from Morris County, New Jersey
American football tight ends
Boston College Eagles football players
New York Giants players
Atlanta Falcons players